Desperado was an American heavy metal band formed by Dee Snider in 1988, after Twisted Sister was disbanded. The band dissolved in the early 1990s due to problems with the record label and the then emerging grunge trend. The album, much bootlegged, was issued officially some years later and reissued as Ace on Angel Air, featuring eleven of the thirteen tracks from the initial reissue of the album under the alternate title Bloodied But Unbowed.

Dee Snider Desperado Limited Edition was released by Deadline Records on April 21, 2009,

Past members
Dee Snider – Vocals (1988-1990)
Bernie Tormé - Guitars (1988-1990)
Marc Russell – Bass (1988-1990)
Clive Burr – Drums (1988-1990)

Discography
Bloodied But Unbowed (1996)
Ace (2006)
Dee Snider Desperado Limited Edition (2009)

External links
Dee Snider/Desperado website
Bernie Torme website
Metal-archives.com

American heavy metal musical groups
Musical groups established in 1988